Kagnew Station was a United States Army installation in Asmara, Eritrea on the Horn of Africa. The installation was established in 1943 as a U.S. Army radio station, taking over and refurbishing a pre-existing Italian naval radio station, Radio Marina, after Italian forces based in Asmara surrendered to the Allies in 1941. Kagnew Station operated until April 29, 1977, when the last Americans left. The station was home to the United States Army's 4th Detachment of the Second Signal Service Battalion.

Overview

Its altitude and close proximity to the equator made Kagnew Station an ideal site for the Cold War listening station's dishes and the  antenna farm. In all Kagnew sprawled over  containing eight fenced or walled tracts. Kagnew Station became home for over 5,000 American citizens at a time during its peak years of operation during the 1960s.

Fighting between the Ethiopian military and Eritrean resistance fighters forced the closing of military's Keren R & R Center, located in the city of Keren in 1971. The Massawa R&R Center (the U.S. Army Red Sea Rest Center), located on the Red Sea closed after departure of the Army in 1973. The U.S. Army's 12 million dollar cost for maintaining their soldiers at Kagnew Station faced a budget axe in 1972 and the U.S. Army withdrew from Kagnew Station in 1973 but the Navy personnel remained. Command of Kagnew Station was transferred from the Army to the Navy on July 1, 1973.

Fighting between the Eritrean resistance and the Ethiopian government forces began affecting operations at Kagnew Station in the 1970s. In March 1971, 3,500 Americans remained at Kagnew Station, 1,900 personnel (1,700 of whom were military) and 1,600 dependents. By July 18, 1972, U.S. personnel at Kagnew Station were reduced to 900 personnel. In March 1974, only 100 civilian technicians remained to operate the residual communications facility, along with their families, and eight to ten U.S. military personnel.

On the night of January 31, 1975, heavy fighting broke out in Eritrea and incoming rocket-propelled grenades landed inside the Tract E compound. This began a season of frequent nighttime firefights between the Eritrean resistance and the Soviet-backed Ethiopian forces. On 14 July 1975, gunmen abducted two Americans and four Ethiopians from Kagnew Communications Station. The Americans, Steve Campbell and Jim Harrel, worked for Collins International Service Company (CISCO), a government contractor. On Friday 12 September 1975, the Eritrean Liberation Front, ELF, raided the US facility at Asmara, kidnapping a further eight people, including two Americans.

On February 12, 1976 a meeting at the White House Situation Room took place discussing Kagnew Station. Lt. General Smith stated, "Right now fleet operations are dependent on Kagnew. The Navy has a strong interest in keeping it. They have reaffirmed to me that if they don't have Kagnew they would need a similar site elsewhere". At one point in the discussion, Mr. Noyes said, "Yes. If we didn't have Kagnew there would be communications delays 25% of the time."

By December 1976 the only critical function appeared to be Mystic Star. In the same memorandum, the United States Department of Defense stated, "It recommends closing Kagnew by September 1977 if Mystic Star can be relocated".

U.S. State Department "Background Notes: State of Eritrea, March 1998," stated, "In the 1970s, technological advances in the satellite and communications fields were making the communications station at Kagnew increasingly obsolete. Early in 1977, the United States informed the Ethiopian Government that it intended to close Kagnew Station by September 30, 1977. In the meantime, U.S. relations with the Mengistu regime were worsening. In April 1977, Mengistu abrogated the 1953 mutual defense treaty and ordered a reduction of U.S. personnel in Ethiopia, including the closure of Kagnew Communications Center and the consulate in Asmara". Not included in the report are the circumstances of the closing of Kagnew Station. In April, 1977, The Ethiopian Government closed the United States military installations and gave Military Assistance Advisory Group (MAAG) personnel a week's notice to leave the country. A large store of equipment remained behind in the rapid American departure. Ethiopia then abrogated the 1953 United States-Ethiopian Mutual Defense Assistance Agreement and terminated the lease on Kagnew station. On April 29, 1977, the last Americans left Kagnew Station.

History

Early history
In March 1941 Roosevelt administration declared Ethiopia eligible for the military aid program known as the Lend-Lease program. This was done to support the British troops in Libya and Egypt which were fighting Germany's Afrika Korps. The focus of the lend-lease program was in Eritrea, a former Italian colony which strategically bordered the Red Sea. British forces had established a communications base at the former Italian radio communications base named called Radio Marina, which was located in Asmara, Eritrea. The British used the former Italian name for the base, Radio Marina. The United States received access to the base from the British beginning in 1942. The United States would initially call the former Radio Marina the "Asmara Barracks," but the name "Radio Marina" would become the more enduring name for the base until the base was officially named "Kagnew Station". In 1943 a seven-man detachment refurbished the former British facilities and began testing the new equipment they installed. Early testing proved so promising that the War Department moved to expand operations before Asmara Barracks officially opened.

On June 1, 1943, two officers, one warrant officer and 44 enlisted men began intensive training at Vint Hill Farms to man Radio Marina. In December, 4 officers and 50 enlisted men staffed Radio Marina, a base located on an arrowhead-shaped tract of land, designated as Tract A by the U.S. Military. While the United States had access to base since 1942, a formalized agreement to permit the United States use of the site did not exist until 1952 when the Ethiopian government, the federation of Eritrea and the United States signed an agreement.

Kagnew Station Tract E:

In 1953, the base officially acquired the name of Kagnew Station. The United States obtained from the Ethiopian government, a tract of land several city blocks to the west of Tract A, which it designated Tract E. In 1957 the activities and headquarters for Kagnew Station began moving to Tract E. Kagnew Station was officially dedicated in 1958 on Tract E.

Kagnew Station was supplied by planes from the U.S. Airbase in Dhahran, Saudi Arabia, and by ships docking at the Red Sea port of Massawa. Its chapel had a seating capacity of 220 and an over-flow space to accommodate 150 more persons. The Guest House had eight rooms, a lobby and a kitchen, all made of concrete-block construction. The Roosevelt Theatre seated 320 patrons and was equipped with a CinemaScope screen and the latest sound and projection equipment. The gymnasium had a regulation basketball court with bleachers, retractable backboards and an electric scoreboard. It also housed ten bowling lanes, a boxing ring, gymnastic equipment, a locker room and shower rooms. The Dependent School had 17 classrooms, a large auditorium, science laboratory and library. A combined laundry-and-dry-cleaning plant could clean 50,000 pieces a month. KANU TV and KANU Radio provided television and radio services. Kagnew also had the usual Commissary, Post Exchange, snack bar and post office. The base Service Center included a music room, craft shop, photography darkroom, library and an auto shop. A football field, softball field and an indoor pool were also available. Children could play golf on the $22,000 miniature golf course; and adults played on the 18-hole golf course. Kagnew Farms, located northwest of Tract E, on the old Radio Marina Transmitter Site, became a recreation and picnic are known as Kagnew Farms until construction of STONEHOUSE at the same site in 1964. Kagnew Farms contained a skeet range, a small-bore rifle and pistol range, the Afro-American Racing Club's banked-dirt oval track (Used for car races, motorcycle scrambles and gherry cart races.), and a large picnic area.

The military passed off Kagnew Station as a "telephone relay station" to disguise its real activities. The secret of Kagnew Station was kept not by hiding the equipment but by openly displaying the equipment and passing it off as something innocent: a telephone relay station and deep space research site. In 1964, an  dish and a  dish arrived in Massawa and were brought up the mountain in sections to Kagnew Station. The dishes were used at Stonehouse, the military's "Deep Space Research Site," which was a joint project of the North American Aerospace Defense Command (NORAD) and the Army Security Agency (ASA). Other agencies operating at Kagnew Station included the Central Intelligence Agency (CIA), the Army Security Agency (ASA), the U.S. Strategic Communications Command (STRATCOM), the Navy Communications (NAVCOMM) and a signal research unit. Located on nearly the same longitude as the Soviet deep space command center in the Crimea, the large Stonehouse antennas were used to monitor telemetry from a variety of Russian spacecraft.

As more personnel and dependants began to arrive in the 1960s a severe family housing shortage saw portions of Tract A, become a housing area. New apartment buildings replaced the older barracks buildings and football field.

The United States spent 77 million dollars building Kagnew Station. In terms of 2006 dollars, Kagnew Station would have cost 495 million dollars to build.

Tracts A through H:

Kagnew Station consisted of eight (8) separate sections of land called tracts. Kagnew Station's tracts were designated by the letters A through H.

Tract A is the old Italian Navy's Radio Marina site. "Radio Marina" translates to "Radio Navy". It is located within the city of Asmara. When the Italians were defeated by the English forces during World War II, Radio Marina became controlled by the British military administration until they left Eritrea. At that time the British handed off Radio Marina to the United States. While the United States had access to base since 1942, a formalized agreement to permit the United States use of the site did not exist until 1952 when the Ethiopian government, the federation of Eritrea and the United States signed an agreement. When construction had progressed enough on Tract E, Kagnew Station officially opened on Tract E in 1958. Tract A remained active and underwent changes in the following two decades including the former parade ground and ball field becoming dependent housing areas.

Following the withdrawal from Kagnew Station by the U.S. military, Tract A by Mengistu Haile Mariam's troops and Tract A was then called Algen Camp.

Tract B was the STRATCOM receiver site and was the site closest to the Asmara airport. Following the withdrawal from Tract B by U.S. Military forces the Tract B site was used as a prison. On May 19, 2004, Amnesty International reported, under the heading of "Secret Prisons in Eritrea" the existence of a secret prison on Tract B (also known as "Track B," which they stated was located near the airport in Asmara. The prison was said to hold Eritrean People's Liberation Front veterans, conscripts, alleged armed Islamists, and people accused or forging identity documents or smuggling army deserters out of the country.

Tract C was known as the Operations Site. It was located west of Tract E and its large antenna field was slangly referred to as "the funny farm". The site operated 24 hours a day. Operations on Tract C ceased March 24, 1972.

Tract D was the STRATCOM transmitter site and was located near a dam. The dam by tract D blown up by shifta in mid-1972.

Tract E was the Kagnew Station headquarters for the completely self-contained U.S. Cold War intelligence facility located in the isolated province of Eritrea, Ethiopia, (now the State of Eritrea). Kagnew Station was an oasis of luxury in the poverty stricken land of Eritrea. Tract E was supplied by aircraft from the U.S. Airbase in Dhahran, Saudi Arabia, and by ships docking at the Red Sea port of Massawa. Tract E's chapel had a seating capacity of 220 and an over-flow space to accommodate 150 more persons. The Guest House on Tract E had eight rooms, a lobby and a kitchen, all made of concrete-block construction. The Roosevelt Theatre seated 320 patrons and was equipped with a Cinemascope screen and the latest sound and projection equipment. The gymnasium on Tract E had a regulation basketball court with bleachers, retractable backboards and an electric scoreboard. It also housed ten bowling lanes, a boxing ring, gymnastic equipment, a locker room and shower rooms. The Dependent School inside Tract E had 17 classrooms, a large auditorium, science laboratory and library. Tract E contained a combined laundry-and-dry-cleaning plant the KANU Television and KANU Radio services, a Commissary, Post Exchange, snack bar and post office. The base Service Center included a music room, craft shop, photography darkroom, library and an auto shop. A football field, softball field and an indoor pool were also located inside the walls surrounding Tract E. Children played golf on a $22,000 miniature golf course and adults played golf on the 18-hole golf course.

Tract F was the home of the Navy receiver site.

Tract G was the home of the U.S. Army STRATCOM Satellite terminal at Gura.

Tract H was the home of the Navy Transmitter site at Gura.

Recreation:

Recreation at Kagnew Station was available in many forms. In addition to on and off base recreation, Kagnew Station had R & R centers available for those serving at Kagnew Station and their dependants (wives and children).

Kagnew Farms was located by Asmara and opened October 22, 1961 on the old Radio Marina transmitter site northwest of Tract E. Kagnew Farms contained a skeet range, a small-bore rifle and pistol range, the Afro-American Racing Club's banked-dirt oval track which was used for car races, motorcycle scrambles and gherry cart races. Kagnew Farms also contained a large picnic Area. In 1964 Kagnew Farms was over-taken by the construction of Stonehouse.

The Keren (Cheren) R & R Center opened June 1959 and closed January 1971. The U.S. Army Massawa R & R Center, located in the C.I.A.A.O. Hotel, a hotel prefabricated in Italy and put together in Massawa in 1937, closed in 1963 for financial reasons. On November 4, 1967, the U.S. Army Red Sea Rest Center, opened in Massawa and was maintained by TTU (Transportation Terminal Unit).

References

Further reading 
 Wrong, Michaela. 2005. I didn't do it for you: How the world used and abused a small African nation. London: Harper Perennial. Specifically about Kagnew Station, pp. 216–236.
Zook, Caroline. 2016. "Kagnew Station: Africa, American Style (Our Life Amongst GIs, Switchbacks, and Gherry Carts)." Kagnewkids.com.

External links 
Kagnew Station
Personal Experience at Kagnew Station
Remembering KAGNEW STATION, Jun 2007, by Rasmuson, John R
Project Stonehouse
"Kagnew Station: Africa, American Style (Our Life Amongst GIs, Switchbacks, and Gherry Carts)"
"A History of Kagnew Station and American Forces in Eritrea", by John R. Rasmuson

Ethiopia–United States relations
Closed installations of the United States Army
Asmara
1940s establishments in Eritrea